The GoSports Foundation (GSF) is an independent, donor-funded non-profit venture, working towards securing funds and professional expertise for some of India's junior Olympic and Paralympic athletes. Established in 2008, it has worked with numerous athletes from across multiple Olympic and Paralympic disciplines through its scholarship programs.

Joined by one of the only two Olympic gold medalists from India, Abhinav Bindra, former Indian cricket team captain Rahul Dravid, and All England Open badminton champion Pullela Gopichand on its Board of Advisors, GoSports Foundation's mission is to empower India's future Olympians.

Mission 
The mission of GoSports Foundation is to empower India's future Olympians.

Programs 

The GoSports Foundation Programs are structured as part of a three-level pyramid with each successive higher level aimed at enabling young Indians to start, stay in, and succeed at sport.

ACE Management Programme is a high-performance elite athlete management program, in which athletes are offered pro bono advisory and consultation services by the GoSports Foundation's panel of experts, consisting of nutritionists, psychologists, fitness trainers, lawyers, media, public relations experts, etc.

PACE Scholarships are offered to promising junior athletes in the age group of 13–21 years, from Olympic and Paralympic disciplines in their run-up to graduating to senior competition. PACE Scholars receive both monetary and non-monetary support.

PACER Projects are the GoSports Foundation's special projects aimed at research, knowledge management and personalized athlete-oriented interventions.

Special Projects:

The Rahul Dravid Athlete Mentorships for athletes in Olympic and Paralympic disciplines. Rahul Dravid and his team of experts personally advise chosen athletes through the year and mentor them through their sporting journeys.

Shooting development programmes in association with Abhinav Bindra Foundation. Abhinav Bindra Foundation and GoSports Foundation conduct joint programs for the development of junior Indian shooters. The programs include scholarships for selected shooters, development workshops for coaches and shooters, equipment support, as well as an opportunity for select junior shooters to receive one-on-one mentorship from Abhinav Bindra.

The GoSports Foundation Athletes’ Conclave is held with an objective to develop inspiration, promote knowledge and bonding among the athletes. The Conclave features seminars from some of India's leading sports industry experts, as well as successful sportspersons.

Coach Education Programmes for Badminton coaches are held every year in association with the Badminton Association of India. The programs are aimed to align the badminton training programs all across India to fall in line with the National Training Program for all age groups. This ensures that a larger talent pool is fed into the national circuit, and creates a pool of well-informed coaches in different parts of the country.

Athlete achievements 
Some of the achievements of the athletes supported by GoSports Foundation:

 GSF had 5 athletes representing India at the 2014 Commonwealth Games in Glasgow, Scotland: Sharath Gayakwad (Para-Swimming), Soumyajit Ghosh, Harmeet Desai (both Table tennis), Kidambi Srikanth and RMV Gurusaidutt (both Badminton), the latter winning the bronze medal in the Men's Singles category.
 Sumit Antil won the gold medal in men's javelin throw F64 category at the 2020 Summer Paralympics.
 Swimmers Virdhawal Khade, Sandeep Sejwal (Beijing 2008) and Gagan Ullalmath (London 2012) represented India at the Olympic Games.
 Para-swimmer Sharath Gayakwad was India's lone representative in swimming at the London 2012 Paralympic Games.
 Soumyajit Ghosh became India's youngest men's table tennis player to qualify for the Olympic Games. He represented India at the London 2012 Games.
 Badminton player Srikanth Kidambi became the first Indian to win a Grand Prix Gold event outside India when he won the Thailand Open in 2013.
 Golfer S. Chikkarangappa turned professional in 2013, and even went on to win a PGTI event in his rookie year.
 Heptathlete Swapna Barman won gold at the 2018 Asian Games and placed first in the Heptathlon at the 2017 Asian Athletics Championships.

References

External links 
  GoSports Foundation Website 

Sports organisations of India
Non-profit organisations based in India
Sports charities
Recipients of the Rashtriya Khel Protsahan Puruskar